Zlatаn Vanev Vasilev (original name: Златан Ванев Василев, born  in Shumen) is a Bulgarian male weightlifter, competing in the 85 kg category and representing Bulgaria at international competitions. He participated at the 1996 Summer Olympics in the 70 kg event. He competed at world championships, most recently at the 2002 World Weightlifting Championships.

He set a new world record on 28 April 2000 in the Clean & Jerk with 207.5 kg in Sofia, Bulgaria .

He was suspended due to a tampering with test.

After his own career he became the personal trainer of weightlifter Valentin Hristov.

Major results

References

External links

 

1973 births
Living people
Bulgarian male weightlifters
Weightlifters at the 1996 Summer Olympics
Olympic weightlifters of Bulgaria
People from Shumen
World Weightlifting Championships medalists
Doping cases in weightlifting
Bulgarian sportspeople in doping cases
World record setters in weightlifting